The Manhattan Fencing Center in Manhattan, New York City, was founded in 2007 by Yury Gelman. It is the home to the Olympic silver medal saber team (Beijing), three top 8 finishers in the 2012 London Olympics, a number of members of the U.S. National Men's and Women's Saber Team, and world, national, and NCAA champions.

Fencing Foundation of America

Manhattan Fencing Center is the home of the Fencing Foundation of America.

Notable fencers
 Monica Aksamit (born 1990), saber fencer; won a bronze medal at the 2016 Summer Olympics in the Women's Saber Team competition.
 Daryl Homer (born 1990), saber fencer; competed in the 2012 Summer Olympics and the 2016 Summer Olympics; won the silver medal in individual saber at the 2016 Olympics, was a silver medalist at the 2015 World Fencing Championships, and is a five-time gold medalist at the Pan American Fencing Championships.
 Timothy Morehouse (born 1978), saber fencer who won a silver medal competing in the men's saber as a member of the United States fencing team at the 2008 Summer Olympics in Beijing.
 Dagmara Wozniak (born 1988), saber fencer; named to the U.S. Olympic team at the 2008 Summer Olympics in women's saber competition as a substitute, and as a competitor at the 2012 and 2016 Summer Olympics, in which she won a bronze medal.

See also 

 Fencing (practice and techniques)
United States Fencing Association

References

External links
Manhattan Fencing Center homepage

Fencing in the United States
Fencing venues
Sports in Manhattan
Fencing organizations
Fencing clubs
Sports clubs established in 2007
2007 establishments in New York (state)